Buakea venusta is a species of moth of the family Noctuidae. It is found in Kenya on altitudes between 636 to 1.066 meters.

The wingspan is 18–22 mm for males and 19–21 mm for females.

The larvae feed on Cynodon aethiopicus. Full-grown larvae reach a length of 25–30 mm.

References

Moths described in 2011
Xyleninae